Joseph Aloysius Shannon (February 11, 1897July 20, 1955) was a Major League Baseball second baseman and outfielder who played five games for the Boston Braves in 1915. He is the twin brother of Red Shannon, and both played on the Braves in the 1915 season.  They played together in only one game, on October 7, 1915, Red's first-ever major league game, and Joe's last.

References 

1897 births
1955 deaths
Major League Baseball infielders
Major League Baseball outfielders
Baseball players from Jersey City, New Jersey
Boston Braves players
New Haven Murlins players
Baltimore Orioles (IL) players
Binghamton Bingoes players
Akron Buckeyes players
Columbus Senators players
Toledo Mud Hens players
Jersey City Skeeters players
Montreal Royals players
Columbus Foxes players
Asbury Park Sea Urchins players
Seton Hall Pirates baseball players